Grandview Cemetery is a cemetery in Chillicothe, Ohio.

About 
Grandview Cemetery (originally spelled Grand View as two words) was established around 1841. The ground the cemetery stands on looks down upon the valleys of the Scioto River and Paint Creek, with a panoramic view of the city of Chillicothe. The land for Grandview was purchased outside of the city limits of Chillicothe in order to provide a more restful setting for the new cemetery (one of the burial grounds it replaced later became the site of a railroad depot).

Grandview Cemetery was added to the National Register of Historic Places in 1978.

Notable burials

 William Allen (governor) 
 Henry Holcomb Bennett
 Harold Kile Claypool
 Horatio Clifford Claypool
 William Creighton, Jr.
 Edwin H. Davis
 Lewis Deschler
 Albert Douglas
 Richard Enderlin
 Joseph Scott Fullerton
 Dard Hunter
 William A. Ireland
 Nathaniel Massie
 Duncan McArthur
 Joseph Miller
 Lawrence Talbot Neal
 Noel Sickles
 Joshua Woodrow Sill
 Burton E. Stevenson
 Edward Tiffin
 Carey Trimble
 John Inskeep Vanmeter
 Thomas Worthington (governor)
 One British Commonwealth war grave, of Captain Charles H. Becker of the East Surrey Regiment of World War I.

Notes

External links
 
 History of Ross County, Ohio

Chillicothe, Ohio
Cemeteries on the National Register of Historic Places in Ohio
Protected areas of Ross County, Ohio
National Register of Historic Places in Ross County, Ohio
Historic districts on the National Register of Historic Places in Ohio